General Sir Arthur Benjamin Clifton  KSA KSW (17718 March 1869) was a British soldier who fought in the Peninsular War and commanded the Second Union Cavalry Brigade at the Battle of Waterloo on 18June 1815.

Biography
Clifton was the third son of Sir Gervase Clifton, 6th Baronet, (1744–1815), one time High Sheriff of Nottinghamshire.

Educated at Rugby, he entered the army in 1794. He served throughout the Peninsular War and received the gold medal and one clasp for service at the battles of Fuentes de Oñoro and Vittoria. On the death of Major General Sir William Ponsonby at Waterloo, Clifton commanded the 2nd Union Cavalry Brigade. He was subsequently promoted to the rank of general.

He was appointed Knight Commander of the Order of the Bath (KCB) in the 1838 Coronation Honours, and raised to Knight Grand Cross (GCB) in 1861. He died unmarried on 8March 1869 aged 98 at his residence in the Old Steine, Brighton.

Family
He was the brother of Sir Robert Clifton, 7th Baronet, Sir Juckes Granville Juckes-Clifton, 8th Baronet and Frances Egerton Clifton who married the Ven. Robert Markham, archdeacon of York, in 1797.

References

|-

1771 births
1869 deaths
1st The Royal Dragoons officers
British Army commanders of the Napoleonic Wars
British Army generals
11th Hussars officers
People educated at Rugby School
Knights Grand Cross of the Order of the Bath
Recipients of the Waterloo Medal
Knights Cross of the Military Order of Maria Theresa
Knights Fourth Class of the Military Order of William
Recipients of the Order of St. Anna, 2nd class
Recipients of the Order of St. Vladimir